Otofacial syndrome is an extraordinarily rare congenital deformity in which a person is born without a mandible, and, consequently, without a chin.

In nearly all cases, the child does not survive because it is unable to breathe and eat properly. Even with reconstructive surgery, the tongue is extremely underdeveloped, making unaided breathing and swallowing impossible.

Cause

Treatment
The first challenge to survival is assisted breathing and tubal feeding. This is a lifelong affair, generally requiring the patient to spend nearly all of the time under direct hospital care.

American surgeons successfully used bone from the hip of an Irish teenager named Alan Doherty to rebuild a jaw and chin. Surgeons began the procedures in June 2007 and completed the final of seven surgeries on 25 August 2008. Doherty is now able to smile, but is still unable to breathe, eat, or speak on his own.

References

Congenital disorders of eye, ear, face and neck
Syndromes affecting the tongue
Syndromes affecting the jaw